The sixth and final season of the television series Leave It to Beaver aired from September 27, 1962, to June 20, 1963, on ABC. It consisted of 39 black-and-white episodes, each running approximately 25 minutes.

Production 

The sixth season of Leave It to Beaver debuted on ABC September 27, 1962, with "Wally's Dinner Date" and aired its last episode, "Family Scrapbook", June 20, 1963. Like the previous five seasons, the sixth season consists of 39 black-and-white, full-screen, half-hour episodes (with ads) shot on 35mm film.

Opening and closing sequences
In the opening sequence, the camera shows the Cleavers' front yard and June walks out of the house with a picnic basket. She then looks back to see Ward leaving the house with more picnic supplies. He looks back to see Wally, who runs out looking back at Beaver, who runs out of the house at full speed, closing the door behind him. They then get in their car while Beaver looks out the back window (which was removed for filming), smiling. The closing sequence shows Beaver and Wally walking and arguing, leading to a chase to the house.

Direction and writing
Norman Abbott, David Butler, or Hugh Beaumont directed most of the episodes. Episodes were written by either the writing teams of Joe Connelly and Bob Mosher or Dick Conway and Roland MacLane.

Casting
All four cast members appear in every episode. Rusty Stevens, who played Larry Mondello in the first four seasons, returns in flashbacks in the finale, "Family Scrapbook."

Leave it to Beaver Universe
In this season, Wally and Beaver are both finishing phases of their education. Beaver is in eighth grade at Grant Ave. Grammar School and is preparing for high school. Wally is in twelfth grade and is finishing high school before starting his undergraduate education at the school referred to in several episodes as "State."

Episodes

References
 Applebaum, Irwyn. The World According to Beaver. TV Books, 1998. .
 IMDb: Leave It to Beaver. Season 6.
 Mathers, Jerry....And Jerry Mathers as "The Beaver". Berkley Boulevard Books, 1998. .

6